Helter Skelter: L.A. Art in the 1990s, named after The Beatles' song that motivated Charles Manson, was a contemporary art exhibition held from January 26, to April 26, 1992, at the L.A. Museum of Contemporary Art. Organized by Paul Schimmel, Helter Skelter displayed the work of 16 artists.  Featuring works of sex, violence, and warped Americana, the exhibition aimed to destroy stereotypes of L.A. art and challenge the New York school. At the time Helter Skelter was hailed as the prime example of modern contemporary art and is still held as one of the most important and influential contemporary art exhibits in recent years.

Artists
The exhibition included work by:
Chris Burden
Meg Cranston
Victor Estrada
Llyn Foulkes
Harry Gamboa, Jr.
Richard Jackson
Mike Kelley
Liz Larner
Paul McCarthy
Manuel Ocampo
Raymond Pettibon
Lari Pittman
Charles Ray
Nancy Rubins
Jim Shaw
Megan Williams
Robert Williams

References

 Fabozzi, P.  "Artists, Critics, Context" Pearson Education, Inc: New Jersey. 452-469 (2002)
 Howard Singerman on Pop noir

External links
MOCA Exhibition Archive - Helter Skelter: LA Art in the 1990s
Helter Skelter Photographic Index
 ART VIEW; 'Helter Skelter' Reveals The Evil of Banality

Culture of Los Angeles